Jamie Moore (born 19 March 1992) is an English professional footballer of Ghanaian descent who is currently a free agent. He plays as an attacking midfielder but can also play as a winger or forward.

Career
Moore started his career in 2012 with PO Ormidia in the Third Division in Cyprus.

In July 2014, he joined Ethnikos Achna of the Cypriot First Division where he failed to make a league appearance for the Cypriot Side.

In September 2014, he signed for Football League (Greece) side A.O.T. Alimos F.C.

References

1992 births
Living people
English sportspeople of Ghanaian descent
Footballers from the London Borough of Newham
English footballers
Association football midfielders
Black British sportspeople
Ormideia F.C. players
Expatriate footballers in Cyprus